João Manuel Vinhas Festas (born 9 October 1967), simply known as Festas, is a former Portuguese professional footballer.

Career statistics

Club

Notes

References

External links

1967 births
Living people
People from Vila do Conde
Portuguese footballers
Portugal youth international footballers
Association football defenders
Primeira Liga players
Segunda Divisão players
Leixões S.C. players
FC Porto players
Varzim S.C. players
Rio Ave F.C. players
SC Vianense players
A.D. Ovarense players
F.C. Tirsense players
C.D. Nacional players
Leça F.C. players
S.C. Beira-Mar players
Sportspeople from Porto District